In enzymology, an estradiol 17alpha-dehydrogenase is an enzyme that catalyzes the chemical reaction

estradiol-17alpha + NAD(P)+  estrone + NAD(P)H + H+

The three substrates of this enzyme are estradiol-17alpha, NAD+, and NADP+, whereas its four products are estrone, NADH, NADPH, and H+.

This enzyme belongs to the family of oxidoreductases, specifically those acting on the CH-OH group of donor with NAD+ or NADP+ as acceptor. The systematic name of this enzyme class is 17alpha-hydroxysteroid:NAD(P)+ 17-oxidoreductase. Other names in common use include 17alpha-estradiol dehydrogenase, 17alpha-hydroxy steroid dehydrogenase, 17alpha-hydroxy steroid oxidoreductase, 17alpha-hydroxysteroid oxidoreductase, and estradiol 17alpha-oxidoreductase. This enzyme participates in androgen and estrogen metabolism.

References

 

EC 1.1.1
NADPH-dependent enzymes
NADH-dependent enzymes
Enzymes of unknown structure